Panmure was a railway station in the town of Panmure, on the Warrnambool railway line in Victoria, Australia. The station was one of 35 closed to passenger traffic on 4 October 1981 as part of the New Deal timetable for country passengers.

References

Railway stations closed in 1981
Disused railway stations in Victoria (Australia)